Achta Saleh Damane is a Chadian journalist and politician.

Since June 30, 2019, Damane has been the Secretary of State for Foreign Affairs.

Career
Damane has held several positions in the Chadian government, including Vice-President of the High Council for Communication, Secretary of State for Foreign Affairs, and general secretary of the Ministry of Communication.

From November 9, 2018 to June 30, 2019, Damane was the Secretary of State for National Education and Civic Promotion.

References

Living people
Government ministers of Chad
Chadian journalists
Women government ministers of Chad
Chadian women journalists
21st-century Chadian women politicians
21st-century Chadian politicians
21st-century journalists
Year of birth missing (living people)